Darwini, a New Latin adjective that commonly refers to Charles Darwin, may refer to:

 Actia darwini, a tachinid fly species
 Aniksosaurus darwini, a dinosaur species from what is now Chubut Province, Argentina
 Atropos darwini, a synonym for Trimeresurus strigatus, a venomous pitviper species from southern India
 Berthelinia darwini, a snail species found in the Houtman Abrolhos
 Boursinidia darwini, a moth species
 Bulimulus darwini, a tropical snail species
 Caerostris darwini, Darwin's bark spider
 Calantica darwini, a species of barnacle from Australia
 Calosima darwini, a species of moth
 Cancellaria darwini, a species of sea snail
 Chelonoidis darwini, a species of Galápagos tortoise
 Cryptocercus darwini, a species of cockroach found in North America
 Cyrtobill darwini, a species of spider from Australia
 Diplocynodon darwini, an extinct species of alligatoroid
 Demandasaurus darwini, the type species of a genus of rebbachisaurid sauropods that lived during the early Cretaceous
 Erechthias darwini, a species of moth
 Mylodon darwini, an extinct giant ground sloth species
 Nesoryzomys darwini, the Darwin's nesoryzomys, Darwin's rice rat or Darwin's Galápagos mouse, a rodent species
 Ogcocephalus darwini, the red-lipped batfish found in the Pacific Ocean
 Parazoanthus darwini, a cnidarian first found in the Galápagos
 Periophthalmus darwini, Darwin's mudskipper, found in Australia
 Phyllodactylus darwini, the Darwin's leaf-toed gecko, a lizard species in the genus Phyllodactylus
 Phyllotis darwini, the Darwin's leaf-eared mouse, a rodent species found in Argentina, Bolivia and Chile
 Puijila darwini, a fossil species of basal pinniped
 Semicossyphus darwini, the Galapagos sheepshead wrasse, a species of ray-finned fish native to the tropical eastern Pacific Ocean
 Senoculus darwini, a spider species found in Argentina
 Stenaelurillus darwini, a jumping spider species found in Tanzania
 Tarentola darwini, the Darwin's wall gecko, endemic to Cape Verde
 Thecacera darwini, a sea slug species found in Chile
 Toxodon darwini, an extinct mammal species of the late Pliocene and Pleistocene epochs
 Valdiviomyia darwini, a South American species of hoverfly
 Xylocopa darwini, the Galápagos carpenter bee

Subspecies 
 Geochelone nigra darwini, the James Island tortoise, a subspecies in the species Geochelone nigra, the Galápagos tortoise
 Ovis ammon darwini, the Gobi argali, a subspecies in the species Ovis ammon, the argali, a wild sheep species

See also 
 Darwin (disambiguation)
 Darwinia (disambiguation)
 Darwinii (disambiguation)
 Darwiniothamnus

Latin words and phrases